Surly Bob's was a sports bar in Yellowknife, Northwest Territories, Canada owned by Bob Ross and Lyle Denny. It closed in October 2012. It served typical pub food and sponsored a basketball team, also named the Surly Bob's. The bar was located at 4910 50th Ave.

History

Precursors (1969 - 2003) 
The establishment was founded in 1969, as The Hoist Room Pub and Grill. In the 1980s, it was known as Millie's Hoist Room. In the 1990s, it was known as The Bistro on Franklin's. In 2000, the restaurant became known as Jose Loco's, when it specialized in Mexican cuisine.

Surly Bob's (2003 - 2012) 
In January 2003, Lyle Denny and Bob Ross acquired Jose Loco's and converted it into a sports bar. It had a full kitchen and Friday and Saturday nights were known as Lobster Night. In January 2012, Jim Schrempp, who had been touring Yellowknife, described the bar as "a friendly basement place, if a bit pricey". The bar became defunct in October 2012.

The Cellar (2013 - 2018) 
On 8 August 2013, Kyle Thomas reviewed "The Cellar", stating that the food was "good, but generic". Thursday nights at the bar were usually live jam nights. The Cellar offered a veggie burger along with a homemade vegan soup special which was different every day. The bar was closed on Sundays and Mondays.

In 2018, the Cellar Bar and Grill, which was operated by General Manager Dale Bardeau, was set to have a change in ownership, as Bardeau planned to move to Winnipeg. In talks to take over the bar, one party sought to maintain the bar as-is, while the other would potentially close the bar for several weeks for a rebranding. In 2018, the bar moved uptown.

As Savannah's Family Restaurant (2019 - ) 
On 18 March 2019, the bar reopened as "Savannah's Family Restaurant". It served East African and Middle Eastern cuisine, including halal meat (goat, lamb, chicken, and fish), injera, lentils, and a veggie burger. It was owned and operated by husband and wife Savannah Perna and Mohamed Mohamed.

As of May 2019, the Fat Fox Café was considering a move there, having closed its doors on 50 Street on 19 May 2018, due to issues with its premises.

However, as of October 2020, Savannah's Family Restaurant was still open, now serving hamburgers, wings, and East Indian cuisines, such as samosas and curry goat. According to Tripadvisor reviews, "the food is beautifully spiced, hot, and served quickly"; they serve "nice Somali flavors", and the restaurant boasts a "very friendly owner and staff" The restaurant was inspected on 29 October 2020.

On 21 September 2020, the Yellowknife Chamber of Commerce announced that Savannah's Family Restaurant was nominated for the 2020 "Resilient New Business Award" by the public. Until 5 October 2020, members of the public could vote online to select who would receive the award.

References 

Restaurants in the Northwest Territories
Buildings and structures in Yellowknife
Defunct companies of the Northwest Territories